Nicolaie-Sebastian-Valentin Radu (20 February 1971 – 9 December 2020) was a Romanian politician.

He was a member of the Social Democratic Party and served in the Chamber of Deputies from 2016 to till his death in 2020.

Radu died from COVID-19, at the age of 49, in 2020.

References

1971 births
2020 deaths
Members of the Chamber of Deputies (Romania)
Deaths from the COVID-19 pandemic in Romania